Brielle, also called Den Briel in Dutch and Brill in English, is a town and historic seaport in the western Netherlands, in the province of South Holland, on the north side of the island of Voorne-Putten, at the mouth of the New Maas.

The former municipality of Brielle also included the communities of Vierpolders and Zwartewaal.

On 1 January 2023, the municipality of Brielle merged with Hellevoetsluis and Westvoorne into the new municipality of Voorne aan Zee.

History

Brielle is a very old, fortified city. Its name is derived from the Celtic word brogilo (meaning "closed area" or "hunting grounds"). The oldest writings about Brielle indicate that the current location is the "new" Brielle. Den ouden Briel (Old Brill) must have been situated somewhere else on the Voorne-Putten Island. It received city rights in 1306. The city was for a long time the seat of the Count of Voorne, until this fiefdom was added to Holland in 1371. It had its own harbour and traded with the countries around the Baltic Sea. Brielle even had its own trading colony in Sweden.

During the Eighty Years' War between the Netherlands and Spain, the Capture of Brielle on April 1, 1572, by Protestant rebels, the Watergeuzen, marked a turning point in the conflict, as many towns in Holland then began to support William of Orange against the Spanish Duke Fernando Álvarez de Toledo, 3rd Duke of Alba who was sent to pacify The Netherlands. This event is still celebrated each year on April 1 and the night before (known as Chalk Night (kalknacht) when the city is defaced with chalk - and now also white paint). Dutch students are taught a short rhyme to remember this fact, which rhyme refers to April Fools' Day:

In Dutch, "de bril" is the word for "the glasses," and closely rhymes with Den Briel; as does "Fles" which stands for the town of Vlissingen or Flushing, the next town to be captured by the Dutch rebels.

After the capture of Brielle the Protestant rebels tortured and murdered the Catholic Martyrs of Gorkum and Brielle has become a pilgrimage location since then.

In August 1585, Brielle was one of the three Dutch towns that became an English possession by the Treaty of Nonsuch when Queen Elizabeth I received it as security of payment for 5000 soldiers (led by the Earl of Leicester) and used by the Dutch in their struggle against the Spanish. The first English governor of Brielle was Thomas Cecil, 1st Earl of Exeter, succeeded by Edward Conway, 1st Viscount Conway who named his daughter Brilliana in honour of the city.  English garrisons were stationed here and at Flushing.  In 1617, these cities returned to the Netherlands.

Twin cities 
Brielle is twinned with:

Notable people 

 Anneke Esaiasdochter (1509 in Brielle – 1539), a Dutch Anabaptist executed as a heretic, a Protestant martyr.
 Willem Bloys van Treslong (1529–1594), a nobleman, lead the Sea Beggars and the Capture of Brielle in 1572. 
 Maarten Tromp (1598 in Brielle – 1653), a Dutch army general and admiral in the Dutch navy
 Witte de With  (1599 in Hoogendijk – 1658), a Dutch naval officer during the Eighty Years War and the First Anglo-Dutch war
 Ludowyk Smits (1635 in Zwartewaal – 1707), a Dutch Golden Age painter
 Philips van Almonde (1644 in Den Briel – 1711), a Dutch Lieutenant Admiral
 Constantijn van Daalen (1884 in Brielle – 1931), a Dutch gymnast who competed in the 1908 Summer Olympics
 Toon Tellegen (born 1941 in Brielle), a Dutch writer and poet, known for children's books and a physician

See also
Historisch Museum Den Briel

Gallery

References

External links

Official website (some pages in English)
http://www.catharijnekerk.nl Website of St Catharijnekerk

Voorne aan Zee
Cities in the Netherlands
Former municipalities of South Holland
Populated places in South Holland
Municipalities of the Netherlands disestablished in 2023